Events from the year 1742 in Denmark.

Incumbents
 Monarch – Christian VI
 Prime minister – Johan Ludvig Holstein-Ledreborg

Events
 13 November– The Royal Danish Academy of Sciences and Letters is founded as a historical Collegium Antiquitatum. It was founded by secretary of state, Count Johan Ludvig Holstein and the history professor Hans Gram.

Undated

Births
 16 February – Niels Lunde Reiersen, government official businessman (died 1795)
 12 April – Søren Gyldendal, bookstore owner, publisher (died 1802)
 5 Julyy  Henrik Gerner, naval officer and shipbuilder (died 1787)
 9 August – Johan Christian Schønheyder, bishop (died 1803)
 7 October – Johan Zoëga, entomologist and botanist (died 1798)
 18 November – Johannes Ewald, dramatist, poet (died 1781)

Deaths
 22 September – Frederic Louis Norden, naval captain and explorer (born 1708)

References

 
1740s in Denmark
Denmark
Years of the 18th century in Denmark